Jorge Ernesto Pineda (born 26 November 1964) is a retired Honduran football player and current football manager. He is currently married to Ena Pineda and has four daughters named Darcy, Georgina, Chelsea and another daughter from a previous relationship named Andrea.

Club career
Born in Valle Department in south Honduras, Pineda left for La Ceiba in the north to study and was snapped up by Vida. He played 8 years for Vida and later for Victoria, Real Maya, Broncos and Real España.

He scored 68 Honduran national league goals in total.

International career
A relatively late newcomer, Pineda made his debut for Honduras in a November 1995 UNCAF Nations Cup match against Panama and has earned a total of 8 caps, scoring 1 goal. He has represented his country in 2 FIFA World Cup qualification matches and played at the 1995 UNCAF Nations Cup, as well as at the 1996 CONCACAF Gold Cup.

His final international was a July 2001 FIFA World Cup qualification match against Costa Rica.

International goals
Scores and results list Honduras' goal tally first.

Managerial career
After he finished his playing career, Pineda became assistant coach at Victoria and later became in charge himself. He has also managed Marathón, F.C. Motagua and moved abroad to lead Guatemalan side Suchitepéquez in the 2009 Clausura. In summer 2009 he was appointed manager of Hispano, returned to Victoria in summer 2010 and he was made coach of Necaxa ahead of the 2011 Apertura. In December 2012 he replaced Carlos Martínez as coach of Vida.

Honours and awards

Country
Honduras
Copa Centroamericana (1): 1995

References

External links

1964 births
Living people
People from Valle Department
Association football midfielders
Honduran footballers
Honduras international footballers
1996 CONCACAF Gold Cup players
C.D.S. Vida players
C.D. Victoria players
Real Maya players
C.D. Broncos players
Real C.D. España players
Liga Nacional de Fútbol Profesional de Honduras players
Honduran football managers
F.C. Motagua managers
C.D. Suchitepéquez managers
C.D. Marathón managers
Juticalpa F.C. managers
Copa Centroamericana-winning players